The Antrim Intermediate Hurling Championship is an annual hurling competition, organised by Antrim GAA.

Clooney Gaels from Ahogill are the title holders (2022).

Honours
The winners of the Antrim Intermediate Hurling Championship progress to the Ulster Intermediate Club Hurling Championship.

History
Sambo won the title in 2019. He was in charge of Naomh Éanna at the time.

Finals

See also
 Antrim Senior Hurling Championship

References

Hurling competitions in County Antrim
Hurling competitions in Ireland
Intermediate hurling county championships